Woodcock Creek is a  long 4th order tributary to French Creek in Crawford County, Pennsylvania.

Course
Woodcock Creek rises about 0.5 miles east of Turkey Track Corners, Pennsylvania, and then flows generally north and northwest to join French Creek just south of Saegertown, Pennsylvania.

Watershed
Woodcock Creek drains  of area, receives about 44.9 in/year of precipitation, has a wetness index of 473.36, and is about 60% forested.

See also
 List of rivers of Pennsylvania

References

Rivers of Pennsylvania
Rivers of Crawford County, Pennsylvania